Pakistan competed at the 2011 Commonwealth Youth Games (officially known as the IV Commonwealth Youth Games) in Isle of Man from 7 to 13 September 2011.The Pakistan Olympic Association selected 4 competitors. None of them won any medals.

References

Nations at the 2011 Commonwealth Youth Games
2011 in Pakistani sport